Adina Megha (1970), (English: The Unwanted Cloud) is a classic Odia film directed by Amit Maitra.

Cast
 Prashanta Nanda - Suresh
 Jharana Das - Champak
 Sandhya
 Bhanumati Devi
 Dukhiram Swain
 Niranjan
 Geeta
 Sagar
 Janaki

Songs

References

External links
 
 Review of Adina Megha in www.mcomet.com
 Casting & Crew of Adina Megha in www.cinemarx.ro

1970 films
1970s Odia-language films
1970 drama films
Indian drama films